Martin-Baker  Aircraft Company Limited is a British manufacturer of ejection seats and safety-related equipment for aviation. The company's origins were originally as an aircraft manufacturer before becoming a pioneer in the field of ejection seats. The company's headquarters are in Higher Denham, Buckinghamshire, England, with other sites in France, Italy and the United States.

Martin-Baker supplies ejection seats for 93 air forces worldwide. Martin-Baker seats have been fitted into over 200 fixed-wing and rotary types with the most recent being the Lockheed Martin F-35 Lightning II programme.

Martin-Baker claimed in 2022 that since the first live ejection test in 1945, a total of 7,674 lives have been saved by the company's ejection seats.

Martin-Baker also manufactures what it calls "crashworthy" seats for helicopters and fixed-wing aircraft. , over 20,000 crashworthy seats have been delivered. The Martin-Baker company continues as a family-run business, run by the twin sons of the late Sir James Martin since Autumn 1979.

History
The factory for building aircraft was established in 1929 by James Martin and "Martin's Aircraft Works" was founded at Denham by James Martin and Captain Valentine Baker with financial help from Francis Francis.  The company was building a prototype aircraft, the MB 1, using the design patents for aircraft structures held by Martin. On 17 August 1934, the Martin-Baker Aircraft Company was formed to continue the work of aircraft development.

Martin and Baker designed an unconventional, two-seat, low-wing monoplane design in the early 1930s as the MB 1. This was powered by a de Havilland Gipsy engine mounted in the fuselage behind the seats and driving a fixed pitch propeller through a shaft running horizontally between the pilot and passenger. The project was abandoned due to financial constraints, although the fuselage and engine installation had been completed. Martin-Baker also constructed an autogyro designed by Raoul Hafner. This, their first complete aircraft project, was later tested by Captain Baker at Heston Aerodrome.

In 1935, Martin and Baker designed and flew their Martin-Baker MB 1, a two-seat light touring aircraft. Their first military design was the Martin-Baker MB 2, a Napier Dagger–powered fighter that flew in 1938. It was a private venture to meet Air Ministry Specification F.5/34 for a fighter for service in the tropics. The MB 2 was tested but neither it nor other designs to F.5/34 were adopted.

 Martin-Baker MB 3 (1942): a six-cannon fighter design, powered by a Napier Sabre. Baker was killed in a crash while testing the prototype.
 Martin-Baker MB 4 (1943): a Rolls-Royce Griffon-engined fighter, cancelled on the drawing board.

The Martin-Baker MB 5 which first flew in 1944 had started out as the second MB 3 prototype but was extensively redesigned with a tubular steel fuselage. It used the Griffon engine driving contra-rotating propellers.
 Martin-Baker MB 6 (1945): a Second World War jet fighter project with a swing-arm, 0/0 spring-loaded ejection seat.
 Martin-Baker MB 7 (1946) Black Bess: a postwar interceptor/high-speed test aircraft concept. Small flying models were made but the concept was cancelled in 1947.

Martin-Baker manufactured aircraft components, including retrofit improvements to the ammunition belt feeds for the  Hispano Mk II autocannon  and armoured seats for Supermarine Spitfires, throughout the Second World War. James Martin also designed and manufactured explosive bolt cutters fitted to bomber wings to cut barrage balloon cables that were fitted to many aircraft and saved a number of aircraft.

In 1944, the company was approached by the Ministry of Aircraft Production to investigate ejection systems enabling pilots to bail out safely from high-speed fighter aircraft.

Ejection seats

Martin-Baker investigated ejection seats from 1934 onwards, several years before Germany and Sweden proposed similar systems in 1938. The company concluded that an explosive-powered ejection seat was the best solution. In particular, Baker's death in 1942 during a test flight of the MB 3 affected Martin so much that pilot safety became his primary focus and led to the later reorganisation of the company to focus primarily on ejection seats.

In 1944, James Martin was asked by the Ministry of Aircraft Production to develop methods for fighter pilots to escape their aircraft. Martin decided that the best method involved ejection of the seat with the occupant sitting in it, aided by an explosive charge. After ejection, the pilot would separate from the seat and open his parachute by pulling a ripcord in the usual way.

At that time there was little information on how much upward thrust the human body could withstand. Data relating to "g" forces in catapult launching of aircraft involved horizontal thrust and was therefore inapplicable to the new problem. Tests would have to be conducted to find out how much upward "g" force a person could tolerate. These were done by shooting a seat up a near-vertical path, loading the seat to represent the weight of the occupant, and measuring the accelerations involved.

A 16-foot (5-metre) test rig was built in the form of a tripod, one of the legs being in the form of guide rails. The seat was propelled up the guide rails by a gun, consisting of two telescopic tubes energised by an explosive cartridge. The guide rails were provided with ratchet stops every three inches (75 mm), so that the seat was automatically arrested at the top of its travel.

Studies were conducted to find the limits of upward acceleration that the human body could stand. The first dummy shot with the seat loaded to 200 lb was made on 20 January 1945, and four days later one of the company's experimental fitters, Bernard Lynch, undertook the first "live" ride, being shot up the rig to a height of 4 feet 8 inches. In three further tests, the power of the cartridge was progressively increased until a height of 10 feet was reached, at which stage Lynch reported the onset of considerable physical discomfort.

The first production Martin-Baker ejection seat, a 'Pre-Mk 1', was installed in the Saunders-Roe SR.A/1 prototype.

The first use of an ejection seat in a practical application by a British pilot involved the Armstrong Whitworth A.W.52 flying wing experimental aircraft in May 1949.

Martin-Baker was a pioneer in expanding the operational envelope of the ejection seat to enable it to be used at low altitudes and airspeeds, leading eventually to development of the "zero-zero" capability in 1961.

Applications

Martin-Baker Mk.1

Martin-Baker Mk.2

Martin-Baker Mk.3

Martin-Baker Mk.4

Martin-Baker Mk.5

Martin-Baker Mk.6

Martin-Baker Mk.7

Martin-Baker Mk.8

 Embraer EMB 312 Tucano
BAC TSR-2

Martin-Baker Mk.9

Dornier Do 31
Hawker Siddeley Harrier
Nord 500
SEPECAT Jaguar
VFW VAK 191B

Martin-Baker Mk.10

Martin-Baker Mk.11
Pilatus PC-7 Turbo Trainer
Pilatus PC-9
PZL-130TC Orlik

Martin-Baker Mk.12
Hawker Siddeley Harrier

Martin-Baker Mk.14 NACES (SJU-17)

This ejection seat is used by the US Navy and is often designated Martin-Baker NACES (Naval Aircrew Ejection Seat) SJU-17 with a suffix letter for the different variants.
Grumman F-14D Tomcat
McDonnell Douglas F/A-18 Hornet
McDonnell Douglas T-45 Goshawk

Martin-Baker Mk.15
Pilatus PC-7 Mk II
UTVA Kobac

Martin-Baker Mk.16
Alenia Aermacchi M-346 Master
Beechcraft T-6 Texan II
Dassault Rafale
Eurofighter Typhoon
TAI Hürkuş
Lockheed Martin F-35 Lightning II
Northrop T-38 Talon
Pilatus PC-21
HAL Tejas
Northrop F-5

Martin-Baker Mk.17

Extremely compact and lightweight ejection seat designed with minimise mass and maintenance. Most lightweight ejection seat in Martin-Baker inventory.
Grob G 120TP

Martin-Baker Mk.18
KAI KF-21 Boramae

Operations
The Martin-Baker company uses its own airfield, Chalgrove Airfield, in Oxfordshire for operational testing of ejection seats. In 2016, ejection tests were carried out at Cazaux Air Base; the company's Meteor aircraft testbeds were flown from Chalgrove to France for them.

Two Gloster Meteor T.7 aircraft, WL419 and WA638, remain in service with the company as flying testbeds. Another Meteor (WA634), used in early development of ejection seats, is retained at the RAF Museum at RAF Cosford.

Ejection Tie Club

Martin-Baker also sponsors an "Ejection Tie Club", producing a tie, patch, certificate, tie pin and membership card for those whose lives have been saved by a Martin-Baker ejection seat. The company also partnered with Bremont to produce a limited-edition wristwatch for members of the club. The watch must be purchased privately, though Martin-Baker does subsidize its cost.  , there are now over 6,000 registered members of the club since it was founded in 1957.

Red Arrows pilot incident
In 2011, Red Arrows pilot Flt. Lt. Sean Cunningham was ejected from his Hawk T1 jet on the ground at RAF Scampton. The parachute failed to deploy and Cunningham was killed. On 22 January 2018, company director John Martin entered a guilty plea to breaching Section 3(1) of the Health and Safety at Work Act 1974 on behalf of Martin-Baker wherein he admitted that the company had been aware of a technical problem with the ejector seat since 1990, but failed to notify the RAF.
It transpired that both the MoD and the Health and Safety Executive had withheld evidence showing the company had regularly provided the necessary information to MoD since, at least, 1958.  The primary evidence was in the form of an RAF training film. Had the instructions in the film been followed, Flt Lt Cunningham's parachute would have opened. It further emerged that MoD had instructed its staff not to implement this training, and re-issued this instruction after the accident. "The firm admitted the health and safety breach on the basis it had failed to provide a written warning to the RAF about over-tightening a bolt on the aircraft."

References

Notes

Bibliography

 Bowyer, Michael J.F. Interceptor Fighters for the Royal Air Force 1935-45. Wellingborough, UK: Patrick Stephens Ltd., 1984. .
 Green, William, ed. "Mr. Martin's Memorable M.B.5." Air International Vol. 16, no. 2, February 1979.
 Green, William. War Planes of the Second World War: Fighters, Volume Two. London, Macdonald & Co. (Publishers) Ltd., 1961.
 Green, William and Gordon Swanborough. WW2 Fact Files: RAF Fighters, Part 2. London: Macdonald and Jane's Publishers Ltd., 1979. .
 Johnson, Brian and Terry Heffernan. A Most Secret Place: Boscombe Down, 1939–45. London: Jane's Publishing Company, 1982. .
 "The Martin-Baker MB-V." Flight, No. 1927, Volume XLVIII, 29 November 1945. p588-590
 
 Zuk, Bill. Janusz Zurakowski: Legends in the Sky. St. Catharine's, Ontario: Vanwell, 2004. .
 Ramsden J, "Martin-Baker: 50 years, 5,000 lives, 50,000 seats" Flight International, 26 May 1979 p1733-1735

External links 

 
 Electronic Library, see Propulsion Systems Contribution to Success of Aircrew Emergency Escape Systems (PDF File, pay site)
 Exit In Extremis a 1948 Flight article
 At low altitudes each second is vital - 150ft. 600mph a 1954 Flight advertisement for Martin-Baker ejection seats
 VTOL a 1966 Flight advertisement for Martin-Baker zero-speed zero altitude ('zero-zero') ejections seats

Aircraft component manufacturers of the United Kingdom
British companies established in 1929
Companies based in Buckinghamshire
Denham, Buckinghamshire
Ejection seats
Science and technology in Buckinghamshire
Science and technology in Oxfordshire
Technology companies established in 1929
Family-owned companies of the United Kingdom
Privately held companies of the United Kingdom